Jonathan David Dore (born November 2, 1975) is a Canadian comedian and actor currently based in Juneau, Alaska.

Education
Dore attended Brookfield High School and studied broadcasting at Algonquin College in Ottawa.

Career
Jon Dore was formerly a correspondent for CTV's Canadian Idol.  Dore also appeared on his own Comedy Now! special for CTV and The Comedy Network, and was featured on the A Channel's comedy special Toronto Laughs.  His show, The Jon Dore Television Show, can be seen on The Comedy Network in Canada, and on the Independent Film Channel in the United States.  In July 2008, Dore appeared on Comedy Central's stand-up show, Live at Gotham along with several other comedians. In 2010, he appeared on the CBS sitcom How I Met Your Mother.

In March 2011, he hosted Funny as Hell  on HBO Canada, a show featuring alternative or musical comedy acts. Season 3 of Funny as Hell premiered on March 22, 2013.

On November 11, 2010, he was the first featured comedian on Conan.

In 2013, Dore appeared as a main cast member alongside Sarah Chalke and Brad Garrett on the short-lived sitcom How to Live with Your Parents (For the Rest of Your Life) and was interviewed by Melinda Hill for the web series All Growz Up with Melinda Hill.

Dore went on tour with Tig Notaro in the Summer of 2013 across the country to film a stand-up documentary for Showtime.

In 2014, he appeared in an uncredited cameo on Alan Thicke's TLC show Unusually Thicke as a drunken stranger who crashes 16-year-old Carter Thicke's party. That same year he appeared in two episodes of Comedy Central's Inside Amy Schumer.

In 2021, Dore created the single-camera sitcom Humour Resources for CBC, playing a fictional version of himself as an HR manager with unscripted interviews with Canadian and American comedians.

Awards

Filmography
 Canadian Idol (2003) – Correspondent
 A Woman Hunted (2003) – TV Host
 Outrage (2003) – Birnbaum 
 Canadian Idol 2 (2004) – Correspondent
 Cream of Comedy (2005) – Host/Writer
 Naturally, Sadie (2006) – Mr. Woodson
 Canadian Comedy Awards: Weekend Wrap-Up (2006) – Himself
 7th Canadian Comedy Awards (2006) – Himself
 Comedy Now! (2007) – Himself/Writer
 The Jon Dore Television Show (2007–2009) – Himself/Creator/Writer/Co-producer 
 The Nice Show (2007) – Himself/Performer/Writer
 Hooked on Speedman (2008) – Jon
 Live at Gotham (2008) – Himself
 CH Live: NYC (2009) – Himself/Writer
 Hotbox (2009)
 Just for Laughs (2009) – Himself/Writer
 10th Canadian Comedy Awards (2009) – Himself
 Winnipeg Comedy Festival (2010) – Himself
 11th Canadian Comedy Awards (2010) – Himself
 Global Comedians (2010) – Himself
 Held Up (2010) – Ray
 Comedy Central Presents (2010) – Himself/Writer
 How I Met Your Mother (2010) – Mugger/Zookeeper
 Scare Tactics (2010) – Freakshow Owner
 Conan (2010–2017) – Himself (7 episodes)
 The Hour (2011) – Himself
 Stag (2011) – Luke
 Talking Hedz (2011)
 My Life As an Experiment (2011) – A.J. Wilder
 Winnipeg Comedy Festival (2012) – Writer
 Funny as Hell (2011–2013) – Host/Writer
 CC: Stand-Up - The Bonnaroo Experience (2012) – Himself
 Mash Up w/ TJ Miller (2011–2012) – Himself/Writer
 Just for Laughs: All-Access (2012) – Himself
 Dino Dan (2011) – Recurring guest Uncle Jack
 All Growz Up with Melinda Hill (2013) – Himself
 Expecting (2013) – Peter
 Set List: Stand Up Without a Net (2013) – Himself
 Who Charted? (2013) – Himself
 How to Live with Your Parents (2013) – Julian Tatham
 This Hour Has 22 Minutes (2014) – Himself
 Katie Chats (2014) – Himself
 Hart of Dixie (2014) – Charles (3 episodes)
 Unusually Thicke (2014) – Jon
 Package Deal (2014) – TJ
 A Dore to Winnipeg (2014) – Himself/Writer/Co-executive producer
 Kroll Show (2014–2015) – Gordon Yarmouth/Quentin Brian (2 episodes)
 Inside Amy Schumer (2014–2015) – Ted/Boyfriend/Max (3 episodes)
 Teen Lust (2014) – Gary
 @midnight (2014–2016) – Himself
 Bummed – (2015) – Billy Sunshine
 Knock Knock, It's Tig Notaro (2015)
 Comedy Bang! Bang! (2015) – Olie "The Goaltender" Marcoux
 After the Reality (2016) – Fitz/Co-producer 
 The Pickle Recipe (2016) – Joey
 Angel from Hell (2016) – Hank (2 episodes)
 Speechless (2016) – Tom
 Those Who Can't (2016) – Dave
 The Crossroads of History (2016)
 Baroness von Sketch Show (2016–2018) – Mr. Bingleby/Pete/Henry/Jack/Bouncer/Lance (6 episodes) 
 The 5th Quarter (2018) – Otis Wood
 Seven Stages to Achieve Eternal Bliss By Passing Through the Gateway Chosen By the Holy Storsh (2018) – Tony
 Cracked (2018) – Dr. Max Nolan/Writer/Executive producer
 Big Questions, Huge Answers with Jon Dore (2018) – Himself
 Humour Resources (2021) – Jon Dore
 The Lake (2022) – Wayne

References

External links
 
 Diamondfield Entertainment feature
 The Jon Dore Television Show on The Comedy Network.

1976 births
Male actors from Ottawa
Canadian stand-up comedians
Algonquin College alumni
Canadian Idol
Canadian male television actors
Canadian television personalities
Living people
21st-century Canadian male actors
Canadian sketch comedians
21st-century Canadian comedians
Canadian male comedians
Canadian expatriate male actors in the United States
People from Juneau, Alaska
Comedians from Ontario
Canadian Comedy Award winners
Juno Award for Comedy Album of the Year winners